Mihkel Truusööt (5 November 1903 Kloostri Parish, Harju County – 23 March 1993 Sweden) was an Estonian politician and businessman. He was a member of Estonian National Assembly and former Minister of Economics.

References

1903 births
1993 deaths
Members of the Estonian National Assembly
Economy ministers of Estonia
Estonian businesspeople
Estonian World War II refugees
Estonian emigrants to Sweden
Estonian military personnel of the Estonian War of Independence
Recipients of the Military Order of the Cross of the Eagle, Class IV
University of Tartu alumni
People from Lääneranna Parish